Sergey Nikolayevich Krylov (born 16 April 1963) is a Russian auto racing driver. He competes in the Russian Touring Car Championship. In 2007 he entered the FIA World Touring Car Championship for two rounds at Brands Hatch in a SEAT León for the independent GR Asia Team. He replaced fellow Russian Timur Sadredinov, who could not attend due to passport problems. His best result was a twentieth position in race two. He has also competed in the European Touring Car Cup's Super Production Cup, where he finished as runner-up in 2005 at Vallelunga.

Krylov is working as an advisor for the construction of the Moscow Raceway circuit.

Complete WTCC results
(key) (Races in bold indicate pole position) (Races in italics indicate fastest lap)

References

External links

1963 births
Living people
Sportspeople from Moscow
Russian racing drivers
World Touring Car Championship drivers
European Touring Car Cup drivers